The Metropolitan Opera House is a historic opera house located in Philadelphia, Pennsylvania. It has been used for many different purposes over its history. Now known as The Met, the theatre reopened in December 2018, after a complete renovation, as a concert venue. It is managed by Live Nation Philadelphia.

Built over the course of just a few months in 1908, it was the ninth opera house built by impresario Oscar Hammerstein I. It was initially the home of Hammerstein's Philadelphia Opera Company, and called the "Philadelphia Opera House". Hammerstein sold the house to the Metropolitan Opera of New York City in 1910, when it was renamed. The Met used the theatre through 1920, after which various opera companies used the house through 1934.

For over five more decades it remained in constant use in turn as a movie theater, a ballroom, a sports venue, mechanic training center, and a church. The building then fell into serious disrepair and was unused and vacant from 1988 until 1995, when it became the "Holy Ghost Headquarters Revival Center at the Met". The church stabilized much of the building, eventually paving the way for the latest renovation of the opera house in 2017–2018.

The opera house has been included in the National Register of Historic Places since 1972.

History
The Metropolitan Opera House was built by Hammerstein to be the home of his then new opera company, the Philadelphia Opera Company (POC). Hammerstein hired architect William H. McElfatrick of the firm J.B. McElfatrick & Son to design the opera house in 1907, and construction began the following year. When it opened as the Philadelphia Opera House in 1908, it was the largest theater of its kind in the world, seating more than 4,000 people.

The opera house officially opened on November 17, 1908 with a production of Georges Bizet's Carmen for the opening of the POC's first season. The cast included Maria Labia in the title role, Charles Dalmorès as Don José, Andrés de Segurola as Escamillo, Alice Zeppilli as Micaëla, and Cleofonte Campanini conducting. The POC continued to use the house for its productions through March 1910. The company's last performance at the house was of Giuseppe Verdi's Rigoletto on March 23, 1910 with Giovanni Polese in the title role, Lalla Miranda as Gilda, Orville Harrold as the Duke of Mantua, and Giuseppe Sturani conducting.

On April 26, 1910, Arthur Hammerstein, with his father's power of attorney, sold the Philadelphia Opera House to the New York Metropolitan Opera. The theater was then renamed the Metropolitan Opera House. The Met, which had annually toured to Philadelphia with performances at the Academy of Music, had been the POC's biggest competition for opera audiences. In spite of two sold-out seasons of grand opera for the POC, Hammerstein ran into debt and had to sell his highly popular opera house to his competitor. The Met's first production at the renamed theater was on December 13, 1910. The Met performed regularly at the MOH for the next decade, giving well over a hundred performances at the house. The Metropolitan Opera's last performance at the MOH was Eugene Onegin on April 20, 1920, with Giuseppe de Luca in the title role and Claudia Muzio as Tatyana.  While the Met owned the MOH, it also rented the venue to other opera companies for their performances. The theater was the home of the Philadelphia-Chicago Grand Opera Company between 1911 and 1914.

The Philadelphia Operatic Society also used the house during and after the Met's tenure, through 1924. After the Met returned to performing at the Academy of Music for the 1920-1921 opera season, the MOH became the home of the Philadelphia Civic Opera Company until 1928.  The Philadelphia Grand Opera Company and the Philadelphia La Scala Opera Company, two companies that primarily performed at the Academy of Music, also occasionally performed there during the 1920s and 1930s. The MOH was also host to many traveling productions by opera companies from other cities. The last opera production mounted at the MOH was a double billing of Cavalleria rusticana and Pagliacci under the baton of Aldo Franchetti, presented by the Chicago Grand Opera Company on May 5, 1934.

By 1920, while still being used as a performing venue for operas, the house began presenting silent films to the public. It remained a cinema venue after the MOH stopped presenting operas.  In April 1922, J.F Rutherford gave the first radio broadcast from the Metropolitan Opera House to an estimated 50,000 people on the discourse "Millions Now Living Will never Die".

On July 14, 1939, a crowd of 6,000 supporters, including 200 active members of the Philadelphia Police Department with German Nazi sympathies, filled the Met to hear the radical anti-Jewish preacher Father Charles Coughlin commission John F. Cassidy to lead his new pro-fascist Christian Front organization.

In the late 1930s, the MOH became a ballroom and in the 1940s a sports promoter bought the venue, covered the orchestra pit with flooring so basketball, wrestling, and boxing could take place. This venture closed after attendance waned following a decline in the quality of the surrounding neighborhood. In 1954, the building was sold and became a church.

Decline
In 1954 the building was purchased by the Rev. Theo Jones who then had a large congregation.  During this time the Philadelphia Orchestra chose the superior acoustics of the Met for several of its recordings. After 1988 however church membership decreased and the building began to deteriorate. The building would eventually be declared imminently dangerous by city building authorities but was saved from demolition in 1996 when it was purchased by the Reverend Mark Hatcher for his Holy Ghost Headquarters Revival Center. Between 1997 and 2013 the church spent approximately $5M USD to stabilize the building.

In October 2012, Holy Ghost Headquarters Church and developer Eric Blumenfeld entered into a development partnership with Blumenfeld eventually purchasing the building for $1. Some interior demolition work began in September 2013 but was halted because the developer had not obtained necessary permits.  In February 2015, the church filed a lawsuit against the developer over the lack of progress on the building, alleging that Blumenfeld misled the congregation regarding his finances and "...never restored the Met as promised. Rather he gutted the auditorium the church had worked so hard to renovate, effectively displacing the church and left the unfinished project in shambles."

Redevelopment
In May 2017, Blumenfeld and Holy Ghost Church had reached a joint ownership agreement.  At the same time, Live Nation signed a lease as a concert promoter and tenant for the building and they and the owners announced a $45-million renovation to bring the theatre back as a mixed use concert venue. It will also continue as the home of the Holy Ghost Church. With restoration work led by Atkin Olshin Schade Architects and Domus as the general contractor, the completely renovated Met Philadelphia reopened to the public on December 3, 2018 with a Bob Dylan concert. One year later Sirius XM radio hosted at the Met the smallest Phish performance in two decades on December 3, 2019.

References

External links

2013 photographs by Matt Lambros

1908 establishments in Pennsylvania
Boxing venues in Philadelphia
Buildings and structures in Philadelphia
Lower North Philadelphia
Metropolitan Opera
Music venues completed in 1908
Music venues in Philadelphia
Opera houses in Pennsylvania
Theatres completed in 1908
Theatres in Pennsylvania
Theatres on the National Register of Historic Places in Philadelphia
National Register of Historic Places in Philadelphia
National Historic Landmarks in Pennsylvania
Philadelphia Register of Historic Places
Live Nation Entertainment
Philadelphia Fusion
Esports venues in Pennsylvania